Robert A. Dillon (February 13, 1889 – November 28, 1944) was an American screenwriter and film director of the silent era. He wrote for more than 80 films between 1914 and 1937. He also directed eight films between 1916 and 1927. Dillon was born in New York City, was a brother of director John Francis Dillon, and died in Los Angeles, California.

Selected filmography

 The Last of the Mohicans (1920)
 The Man Who Woke Up (1921)
 Beating the Game (1921)
 The Lamplighter (1921)
 Winners of the West (1921)
 In the Days of Buffalo Bill (1922)
 The Radio King (1922)
 The Oregon Trail (1923)
 The Santa Fe Trail (1923)
 South of the Equator (1924)
 Three Keys (1925)
 The Prairie Pirate (1925)
 A Million Bid (1927)
 The Range Riders (1927)
 His Last Bullet (1928)
 The Voice from the Sky (1930)
 The Lost City (1935)

References

External links

1889 births
1944 deaths
American male screenwriters
American film directors
Silent film directors
20th-century American male writers
20th-century American screenwriters